The Cessna 340 is a twin piston engine pressurized business aircraft that was manufactured by Cessna.

The Cessna 335 is an unpressurized version, which appears the same externally as the 340. It sold in smaller numbers than the 340.

Design and development
The 340 was conceived as a cabin-class development of the successful Cessna 310.

The 340 is a six-seat aircraft, with four passenger seats, an aisle and an airstair door. The tail and landing gear were based on the Cessna 310's units, while its wings were from the Cessna 414. The 340's primary selling feature was its spacious, pressurized cabin, the first in a light twin.

Work on the 340 began in 1969, and the first aircraft was delivered in 1971, behind schedule because one of the prototypes crashed during flight testing in 1970.

The early models have two turbocharged Continental TSIO-520-K engines with 285 hp (214 kW) each. Starting in 1976, the engines were upgraded to the more powerful Continental TSIO-520-NB engines of 310 hp (233 kW). This variant is known as the 340A and it also features smaller  diameter propellers to reduce noise and meet ICAO Annex 16 noise requirements.

The Cessna 335 was marketed as a low-priced, non-pressurized, version powered by 300 hp (225 kW) Continental TSIO-520-EB engines. The prototype 335 made its maiden flight on December 5, 1978, with the first production aircraft flying in 1979. It was not a market success, with only 64 built by the time production ended in 1980. The 340 was more successful and remained in production until 1984 with 1287 built.

Variants

340
Pressurized six-seat twin powered by two Continental TSIO-520-K engines of 285 hp (214 kW) each. Certified 15 October 1971. 350 built.

340A
Pressurized six-seat twin powered by two Continental TSIO-520-NB engines of 310hp (233 kW) each. Certified 19 November 1975 948 built.

335
Unpressurized six-seat twin powered by Continental TSIO-520-EB engines of 300hp (225 kW) each. Certified 2 October 1979 65 built.

Riley Rocket 340
Conversion of Cessna 340 aircraft by fitting two 340 hp (254 kW) Lycoming TIO-540-R engines. Also designated R340L.

Riley Super 340
Conversion of 1972–1975 Cessna 340 aircraft by fitting two 310hp Continental TSIO-520-J/-N engines. Also known as R340 Super.

Specifications (340A)

See also

References

 R.W.Simpson, Airlife's General Aviation, Airlife Publishing, England, 1991, 
 Taylor, John W. R. Jane's All The World's Aircraft 1980–81. London: Jane's Publishing Company, 1980. .
 Taylor, John W. R. Jane's All The World's Aircraft 1982–83. London: Jane's Yearbooks, 1982. .
 Taylor, John W. R. Jane's All The World's Aircraft 1988–89. Coulsdon, UK: Jane's Defence Data, 1988. .

External links

 Official website Cessna history

340
1970s United States civil utility aircraft
Low-wing aircraft
Aircraft first flown in 1970
Twin piston-engined tractor aircraft